The Lincoln Mystery Plays are modern performances of medieval mystery plays and other productions in Lincoln Cathedral and the surrounding area.

Background 

The Lincoln Mystery Plays are based on the N-Town Plays and were inspired by Keith Ramsay (b.1933-d.2021) who was head of drama at Bishop Grosseteste College during the 1970s. In 1974, Keith directed the Oberfuer Cycle which then led to his work, directing the productions every four years between 1978 and 2000 of the Lincoln Mystery Plays. Throughout these years, Keith worked as translator, artistic director and performer. He developed a performance tradition and an important part of Lincoln life. The cycle continues to this day, with the next cycle expected in 2022.

The plays are performed in the Lincoln Cathedral and Southwell Minster. Apart from the Mystery Plays themselves, there are occasionally other performances. For example, in 2003, Mister Wesley, a new play by Roy Clarke, who also wrote Last of the Summer Wine, was performed in Lincoln and Southwell. In 2014, "The Last Post" was performed by the Lincoln Mystery Plays company at The Drill Hall, and based on the true story of the Beechey brothers. The Beecheys' were a local family in the First World War, who had eight brothers, all of which signed up to fight. Of the eight, five were killed and one was badly injured. The family's youngest daughter, Edith (Edie) and her mother Amy kept over three hundred letters from the brothers, all of which are now housed at the Lincolnshire Archives. This was then followed in 2018 by "The World at her Feet" written by local playwright Steve Gillard marking the 100th anniversary of WW1 and tells the story of women's' football in Lincoln during the war years. This was performed in November 2018 at the Lincoln Drill Hall.

Format 

The Mystery Plays tell the story of mankind as seen through the eyes of a person from the Middle Ages.  The plays are usually set between the birth of Christ and his crucifixion. The plays were written in middle English, the language of the ordinary people of that time. These great guild productions flourished over 200 years in cities throughout the land until Cromwell and the Reformation ended the tradition.

Revival 

The plays were almost forgotten for hundreds of years. The first major revival was in 1951 in York by E Martin Brown.

In 1969 a production of "The Lincoln Cycle of Mystery Plays" was performed at the Cathedral in conjunction with Lincoln Theatre Royal. Adapted from a translation by Martial Rose. First performance was 23 August 1969. Principal actors were Brian Tree, Brian Protheroe and Alison Steadman. The production was directed by Clare Venables and assisted by Rhys McConnochie.

In 1978, Keith Ramsay revived the Lincoln or N-Town Plays plays in Lincoln. He directed nine productions in Lincoln Cathedral and two in Southwell Minster. Keith was invited to present the production at several international conferences on medieval drama. The company performed in Neustadt, Germany; Viterbo, Rome & Camerino Italy; Perpignan, France and Oregon, The United States. This, 1989, was the first time Mystery Plays was performed in the States.

2000 was Mr Ramsay's last production of the Mystery Plays: 2004 saw Karen Crow directing, 2008's production was directed by Geoff Readman, the 2012 production was directed by John Bowtell, 2016 by Colin Brimblecombe and the next production, delayed due to the COVID-19 pandemic, will be directed by Tom Straszewski in July / August 2022 at Lincoln Cathedral and on an unprecedented county-wide tour of principal churches (St James' Louth; St Mary's Horncastle; St Denys' Sleaford and All Saints' Gainsborough) .

2011 saw a Gala Night held as a fund raiser (for the 2012 production) and directed by Angela Gunstone pulling together performances and actors from 1969 to present day performers. Attributed to the show of 69, Lincoln Theatre Royal hosted this show.
Ian Dickens, artistic director of the Theatre Royal, said: "We're really happy to be working with the Lincoln Mystery Plays Trust. "The plays are very important to the community and it's essential they raise as much funds as possible so they can keep going. We have given the trust the Theatre Royal for that night and anything they manage to raise is theirs to keep." Lincolnshire Echo 13.6.11 Gallery 

 Further reading 

Ramsay, Keith. The Lincoln Mystery Plays: A Personal Odyssey.'' London: Nerone Books, 2008. 
A modernised version of the text was produced in 1994 by Prof Ed Schell and Keith Ramsay.

References

External links 
 The Official Lincoln Mystery Plays Website
 Database website listing all Passion Plays
 Lincoln Lip-dub filmed July 2013 By BBC Lincolnshire features some of the cast of the Lincoln Mystery Plays from 5:51

Christian plays
Culture in Lincolnshire
English plays
Folk plays
Cultural depictions of Herod the Great
Lincoln Cathedral
Plays based on European myths and legends
Plays based on other plays
Plays based on the Bible
Plays set in the 1st century